Micrathyria is a Neotropical genus of dragonflies. They have bright green eyes and white faces. Most species have a markedly striped thorax. They are commonly known as Tropical Dashers.

As of 2002, there were about 48 species.

Species include:

References

Libellulidae
Anisoptera genera
Taxa named by William Forsell Kirby